This is a list of medical diagnostic tests that are considered questionable, unverified or refuted.
 Applied kinesiology, including the Bi-Digital O Ring Test
 Barnes Basal Temperature Test
 Breast thermography
 Electro Physiological Feedback Xrroid (EPFX)
 Electrodermal diagnostic devices (e.g. Vega machines, E-meters)
 Genetic tests for "reward deficiency syndrome"
 Hair analysis
 IgG antibody testing for food intolerances and food allergies
 Live blood analysis
 Myers–Briggs Type Indicator (MBTI)
 Pendulum dowsing
 Proove Opioid Risk test (POR)
 Provoked urine testing for heavy metal toxicity
 Radionics
 SPECT scans for diagnosing psychological disorders
 Unvalidated Lyme disease testing, often used to diagnose so-called chronic Lyme disease
 Unvalidated mycotoxin tests

See also
List of topics characterized as pseudoscience
Quackery
List of diagnoses characterized as pseudoscience

References

Alternative medical diagnostic methods
Medical lists